Depictions of nudity include all of the representations or portrayals of the unclothed human body in visual media. In a picture-making civilization, pictorial conventions continually reaffirm what is natural in human appearance, which is part of socialization. In Western societies, the contexts for depictions of nudity include information, art and pornography. Information includes both science and education. Any ambiguous image not easily fitting into one of these categories may be misinterpreted, leading to disputes. The most contentious disputes are between fine art and erotic images, which define the legal distinction of which images are permitted or prohibited.

Definitions
A depiction is defined as any lifelike image, ranging from precise representations to verbal descriptions. Portrayal is a synonym of depiction, but includes playing a role on stage as one form of representation.

Nudity in art

Nudity in art – painting, sculpture and more recently photography – has generally reflected social standards of the time in aesthetics and modesty/morality. At all times in human history, the human body has been one of the principal subjects for artists. It has been represented in paintings and statues since prehistory.

Portraits and nudes without a pretense to allegorical or mythological meaning were a fairly common genre of art during all centuries. Some regard Goya's La Maja desnuda of around 1800, which provoked outrage in Spanish society over the model painted with and without her clothes (desnuda means nude), as "the first totally profane life-size female nude in Western art", but paintings of nude females were not uncommon, especially paintings of mistresses and lover of kings, dukes and other aristocrats and mistresses and wives of the artists. La Maja desnuda was different in only one way, it was exhibited on a public art exhibition.

With the expansion of the display of nudity in art beyond traditional galleries, some exhibitions experience backlash from individuals that equate all nude representations with sexuality, and thus inappropriate for viewing by the general public.

Although naked, Andrea Doria is not fragile or frail. He is depicted as a powerful virile man, showing masculine spirit, strength, vigor, and power.
Bronzino's so-called "allegorical portraits", such as this Genoese admiral, Andrea Doria are less typical but possibly even more fascinating due to the peculiarity of placing a publicly recognized personality in the nude as a mythical figure.

Depictions of youth

For centuries, child nudity was common in paintings that depicted allegorical or religious stories. Modern painters have created images of nude children that depict everyday life. Some sculptures depict nude child figures. A particularly famous one is Manneken Pis in Brussels, showing a nude young boy urinating into the fountain below. A female equivalent is Jeanneke Pis.

Henry Scott Tuke painted nude young boys doing everyday seaside activities, swimming, boating, and fishing; his images were not overtly erotic, nor did they usually show their genitals. Otto Lohmüller became controversial for his nude paintings of young males, which often depicted genitals. Balthus and William-Adolphe Bouguereau included nude girls in many of their paintings. Professional photographers such as Will McBride, Jock Sturges, Sally Mann, David Hamilton, Jacques Bourboulon, Garo Aida, and Bill Henson have made photographs of nude young children for publication in books and magazines and for public exhibition in art galleries. According to some, photographs such as these are acceptable and should be (or remain) legal since they represent the unclothed form of the children in an artistic manner, the children were not sexually abused, and the photographers obtained written permission from the parents or guardians. Opponents suggest that such works should be (or remain) banned and represent a form of child pornography, involving subjects who may have experienced psychological harm during or after their creation.

Sturges and Hamilton were both investigated following public condemnation of their work by Christian activists including Randall Terry. Several attempts to prosecute Sturges or bookseller Barnes & Noble have been dropped or thrown out of court and Sturges's work appears in many museums, including New York's Metropolitan Museum of Art.

There have been incidents in which snapshots taken by parents of their infant or toddler children bathing or otherwise naked were destroyed or turned over to law enforcement as child pornography. Such incidents may be examples of false allegation of child sexual abuse. Author Lynn Powell described the prosecution of such cases in terms of a moral panic surrounding child sexual abuse and child pornography.

Colonialism

In the nineteenth century, Orientalism represented the European view of the Muslim cultures of North Africa. Representations of nude Muslim women included "French postcards" for popular distribution, which escaped legal sanctions by being placed in the category of ethnography rather than porn. In the fine arts, many painters used the trope of the harem as an acceptable context for nude and seminude women.

Nude photography

Photography has been used to create images of nudity that fit into any category; artistic, educational, commercial, and erotic.

Alfred Cheney Johnston (1885 – 1971) was a professional American photographer who often photographed Ziegfeld Follies "showgirls". 
 

Male naked bodies were not pictured as frequently at the time. An exception is the photograph of the early bodybuilder Eugen Sandow modelling the statue The Dying Gaul, illustrating the Grecian Ideal which he introduced to bodybuilding.

Popular culture

Definitions
Nude depictions of women may be criticized by feminists as inherently voyeuristic due to the male gaze. Although not specifically anti-nudity, the feminist group Guerrilla Girls point out the prevalence of nude women on the walls of museums but the scarcity of female artists.
Without the relative freedom of the fine arts, nudity in popular culture often involves making fine distinctions between types of depictions. The most extreme form is full frontal nudity, referring to the fact that the actor or model is presented from the front and with the genitals exposed. Frequently, images of nude people do not go that far. They are instead deliberately composed, and films edited, such that in particular no genitalia are seen, as if the camera by chance failed to see them. This is sometimes called "implied nudity" as opposed to "explicit nudity." It is in popular culture that a particular image may lead to classification disputes.

Advertising

In modern media, images of partial and full nudity are used in advertising to draw attention. In the case of attractive models this attention is due to the visual pleasure the images provide; in other cases it is due to the relative rarity of such images. The use of nudity in advertising tends to be carefully controlled to avoid the impression that a company whose product is being advertised is indecent or unrefined. There are also (self-imposed) limits on what advertising media such as magazines will allow. The success of sexually provocative advertising is claimed in the truism "sex sells." However, responses to nudity in American advertisements have been more mixed; nudity in the advertisements of Calvin Klein, Benetton, and Abercrombie & Fitch, for example, has provoked negative as well as positive responses.

An example of an advertisement featuring male full frontal nudity is one for M7 fragrance. Many magazines refused to place the ad, so there was also a version with a more modest photograph of the same model.

Magazine covers
In the early 1990s, Demi Moore posed nude for two covers of Vanity Fair: Demi's Birthday Suit and More Demi Moore. Later examples of implied nudity in mainstream magazine covers have included:
 Janet Jackson (Rolling Stone, 1993)
 Jennifer Aniston (Rolling Stone, 1996 and GQ, January 2009)
 The Dixie Chicks (Entertainment Weekly, May 2003)
 Scarlett Johansson and Keira Knightley (Vanity Fair, March 2006)
 Serena Williams (ESPN The Magazine'''s Body issue, 2009)
 Alexander Skarsgård, Anna Paquin and Stephen Moyer; from the cast of True Blood (Rolling Stone, September 2010)
 Kim Kardashian (W, November 2010)
 Lake Bell (New York Magazine, August 2013)
Miley Cyrus (Rolling Stone, October 2013)

Comic book
In 1998, two French cartoonist partners Regis Loisel and Philippe Sternis made the feral child graphic novel (bande dessinée) Pyrénée as the cover, and page story in nude.

Music album covers

Nudity is occasionally presented in other media, often with attending controversy. For example, album covers for music by performers such as Jimi Hendrix, John Lennon and Yoko Ono, Nirvana, Blind Faith, Scorpions, Jane's Addiction, and Santana have contained nudity. Several rock musicians have performed nude on stage, including members of Jane's Addiction, Rage Against the Machine, Green Day, Black Sabbath, Stone Temple Pilots, The Jesus Lizard, Blind Melon, Red Hot Chili Peppers, blink-182, Naked Raygun, Queens of the Stone Age and The Bravery.

The provocative photo of a nude prepubescent girl on the original cover of the Virgin Killer album by the Scorpions also brought controversy.

Erotic depictions

Sexually explicit images, other than those having a scientific or educational purpose, are generally categorized as either erotic art or pornography, but sometimes can be both.
Japanese painters like Hokusai and Utamaro, in addition to their usual themes also executed erotic depictions. Such paintings were called shunga (literally: "spring" or "picture of spring"). They served as sexual guidance for newly married couples in Japan in general, and the sons and daughters of prosperous families were given elaborate pictures as presents on their wedding days. Most shunga are a type of ukiyo-e, usually executed in woodblock print format. It was traditional to present a bride with ukiyo-e depicting erotic scenes from the Tale of Genji.

Shunga were relished by both men and women of all classes. Superstitions and customs surrounding shunga suggest as much; in the same way that it was considered a lucky charm against death for a samurai to carry shunga, it was considered a protection against fire in merchant warehouses and the home. The samurai, chonin, and housewives all owned shunga. All three of these groups would undergo separation from the opposite sex; the samurai lived in camps for months at a time, and conjugal separation resulted from the sankin-kōtai system and the merchants' need to travel to obtain and sell goods. Records of women obtaining shunga themselves from booklenders show that they were consumers of it.

The Khajuraho temples contain sexual or erotic art on the external walls of the temple. Some of the sanctuaries have erotic statuettes both on the outside of the inner wall. A small amount of the carvings contain sexual themes and those seemingly do not depict deities but rather sexual activities between human individuals. The rest depict the everyday life. These carvings are possibly tantric sexual practices.

Another perspective of these carvings is presented by James McConnachie in his history of the Kamasutra. McConnachie describes the zesty 10% of the Khajuraho sculptures as "the apogee of erotic art":
Twisting, broad-hipped and high breasted nymphs display their generously contoured and bejewelled bodies on exquisitely worked exterior wall panels. These fleshy apsaras run riot across the surface of the stone, putting on make-up, washing their hair, playing games, dancing, and endlessly knotting and unknotting their girdles....Beside the heavenly nymphs are serried ranks of griffins, guardian deities and, most notoriously, extravagantly interlocked maithunas, or lovemaking couples.

Informational

Educational
Studies of the human body

In art, a study is a drawing, sketch or painting done in preparation for a finished piece, or as visual notes. Painting and drawing studies (life-drawing, sketching and anatomy) were part of the artist's education.
Studies are used by artists to understand the problems involved in execution of the artists subjects and the disposition of the elements of the artist work, such as the human body depicted using light, color, form, perspective and composition. Studies can be traced back as long ago as the Italian Renaissance, for example Leonardo da Vinci's and Michelangelo's studies.
Anatomical studies of the human body were also executed by medical doctors. The physician Andreas Vesalius work of anatomical studies De humani corporis fabrica (On the fabric of the human body), published 1543, was a pioneering work of human anatomy illustrated by Titian's pupil Jan Stephen van Calcar.

The Fabrica emphasized the priority of dissection and what has come to be called the "anatomical" view of the body, seeing human internal functioning as an essentially corporeal structure filled with organs arranged in three-dimensional space. In this work, Vesalius also becomes the first person to describe mechanical ventilation. It is largely this achievement that has resulted in Vesalius being incorporated into the Australian and New Zealand College of Anaesthetists college arms and crest.
Sketching is generally a prescribed part of the studies of art students, who need to develop their ability to quickly record impressions through sketching, from a live model. The sketch is a rapidly executed freehand drawing that is not usually intended as a finished work. The sketch may serve a number of purposes: it might record something that the artist sees, it might record or develop an idea for later use or it might be used as a quick way of graphically demonstrating an image, idea or principle. A sketch usually implies a quick and loosely drawn work, while related terms such as study, and "preparatory drawing" usually refer to more finished drawings to be used for a final work.
Most visual artists use, to a greater or lesser degree, the sketch as a method of recording or working out ideas. The sketchbooks of some individual artists have become very well known, including those of Leonardo da Vinci, Michelangelo and Edgar Degas which have become art objects in their own right, with many pages showing finished studies as well as sketches.

Sexual education
Depictions of nudity, sometimes sexually explicit, are allowed in the context of sex education as appropriate for the age of the students.

Ethnographic photography

What is generally called "ethnographic" nudity has appeared both in serious research works on ethnography and anthropology, as well as in commercial documentaries and in the National Geographic'' magazine in the United States. In some cases, media outlets may show nudity that occurs in a "natural" or spontaneous setting in news programs or documentaries, while blurring out or censoring the nudity in a dramatic work. The ethnographic focus provided an exceptional framework for photographers to depict peoples whose nudity was, or still is, acceptable within the mores, or within certain specific settings, of their traditional culture.

Detractors of ethnographic nudity often dismiss it as merely the colonial gaze preserved in the guise of scientific documentation. However, the works of some ethnographic painters and photographers including Herb Ritts, David LaChappelle, Bruce Weber, Irving Penn, Casimir Zagourski, Hugo Bernatzik and Leni Riefenstahl, have received worldwide acclaim for preserving a record of the mores of what are perceived as "paradises" threatened by the onslaught of average modernity.

See also

Academy figure
Artistic freedom
Pubic hair in art
Tableau vivant
Striptease
Nude (art)
Breast imaging

References

Further reading

Nude art